André Renard (11 December 1889 – 17 September 1950) was a French racing cyclist. He rode in the 1919 Tour de France.

References

1889 births
1950 deaths
French male cyclists
Place of birth missing